Fritillaria yuminensis is a plant species native to the northwestern part of Xinjiang Province in northwestern China.

The flowers are pendent, nodding, bell-shaped, either pink or blue with no markings.

References

External links
Fritillaria Group, Alpine Garden Society, Fritillaria species T-Z

yuminensis
Flora of Xinjiang
Plants described in 1981